This is a list of all cricketers who have played first-class, list A or Twenty20 cricket for Maharashtra cricket team. Seasons given are first and last seasons; the player did not necessarily play in all the intervening seasons. Players in bold have played international cricket.

A
 Kiran Adhav, 2001/02-2009/10
 Ashutosh Agashe, 1996/97-1999/00
 Dnyaneshwar Agashe, 1962/63-1967/68
 Salil Agharkar, 2007/08-2008/09
 Syed Mushtaq Ali, 1940/41
 Salil Ankola, 1988/89-1989/90
 Azhar Ansari, 2008/09-2014/15
 Kaushik Aphale, 1999/00-2005/06
 Sachin Aradhye, 1999/00-2002/03
 Sheshil Arolkar, 1942/43
 Sangram Atitkar, 2008/09-2015/16
 Virag Awate, 2012/13
 Mohammad Ayub, 1938/39

B
 Satyajeet Bachhav, 2012/13-2015/16
 Riaz Bagwan, 1983/84
 Sairaj Bahutule, 2005/06-2007/08
 Vasant Bahutule, 1952/53
 Shamsher Baloch, 1941/42
 Abdul Balooch, 1956/57-1958/59
 Shudamshi Banerjee, 1944/45-1947/48
 Ankit Bawne, 2007/08-2015/16
 Ravindra Bhadbhade, 1951/52-1954/55
 Ratnagar Bhajekal, 1957/58-1959/60
 Ramakrishna Bhajekar, 1940/41-1941/42
 Rajendra Bhalekar, 1972/73-1985/86
 Narayan Bhalerao, 1956/57-1957/58
 Kamal Bhandarkar, 1939/40-1949/50
 Arjunrao Bharbhare, 1954/55
 Prayag Bhati, 2010/11-2015/16
 Kedar Bhave, 1987/88
 Ramachandra Bhave, 1954/55-1959/60
 Surendra Bhave, 1986/87-2000/01
 Aditya Bhide, 1969/70
 Vishnu Bhide, 1954/55
 Kishor Bhikane, 2009/10-2011/12
 Vishal Bhilare, 2007/08
 Prashant Bhoir, 2006/07
 Rohan Bhosale, 2008/09-2011/12
 Rao Bhosle, 1952/53-1960/61
 Shailesh Bhosle, 2001/02-2002/03
 Vijay Bhosle, 1955/56-1966/67
 Chandu Borde, 1952/53-1972/73
 Ramesh Borde, 1972/73-1984/85
 Suyash Burkul, 2001/02-2006/07

C
 Sambhaji Chabukswar, 1948/49-1951/52
 Raghunath Chandorkar, 1943/44-1946/47
 Vasant Chandorkar, 1956/57-1961/62
 Venkat Chari, 1941/42-1950/51
 Dattatraya Chaudhari, 1947/48-1960/61
 Sachin Chaudhari, 2012/13-2013/14
 Chetan Chauhan, 1967/68-1974/75
 Ajay Chavan, 2002/03-2004/05
 Pushkaraj Chavan, 2013/14
 Sangram Chavan, 2004/05-2005/06
 Sumit Chavan, 2011/12
 Parag Chitale, 1993/94-1998/99

D
 Sandeep Dahad, 1995/96-2001/02
 Kishanlal Dalaya, 1941/42
 Anand Dalvi, 1998/99-2002/03
 Madhukar Dalvi, 1947/48-1948/49
 Mandar Dalvi, 1997/98-2004/05
 Bal Dani, 1951/52-1953/54
 Randolf Daniel, 1982/83-1988/89
 Akshay Darekar, 2010/11-2015/16
 Umesh Dastane, 1978/79
 Manohar Datar, 1948/49-1950/51
 SV Datar, 1935/36-1936/37
 D. B. Deodhar, 1934/35-1946/47
 Sharad Deodhar, 1947/48-1948/49
 Pratik Desai, 2006/07-2007/08
 Praveen Deshetti, 2006/07
 MA Deshmukh, 1934/35-1941/42
 Nitin Deshmukh, 1989/90
 Vishwas Deshmukh, 1975/76-1978/79
 Abhijit Deshpande, 1986/87-1991/92
 Anand Deshpande, 1989/90-1990/91
 Anant Dhamane, 1960/61-1963/64
 Sayajirao Dhanawade, 1948/49-1950/51
 Rahul Dholepatil, 2000/01-2001/02
 Nikit Dhumal, 2012/13-2015/16
 Suresh Dhumke, 1971/72
 Ajay Divecha, 1960/61-1961/62
 Jayant Diwadkar, 1952/53-1956/57
 Makarand Dixit, 1980/81-1984/85
 Nikhil Dixit, 1996/97-2000/01
 Gregory D'Monte, 1981/82-1989/90
 Dinshaw Doctor, 1935/36-1952/53
 Aditya Dole, 2005/06-2008/09
 Amit Doshi, 1999/00
 Yogesh Doshi, 1993/94-1995/96

F
 Kaiser Fakih, 1980/81-1989/90
 Samad Fallah, 2007/08-2015/16

G
 Chandrasekhar Gadkari, 1947/48
 Ganesh Gaikwad, 2008/09-2012/13
 Shekhar Gawli, 1997/98-2001/02
 A Ghag, 2000/01
 Arun Ghatpande, 1975/76-1979/80
 Mohammed Ghazali, 1942/43-1946/47 (played international cricket for Pakistan)
 Surjuram Girdhari, 1941/42
 Manohar Godbole, 1947/48
 Niranjan Godbole, 1995/96-2004/05
 Siddarth Godbole, 1998/99
 Mahendra Gokhale, 1998/99
 Yeshwant Gokhale, 1936/37-1950/51
 Hemant Gore, 1959/60-1966/67
 Vishwas Gore, 1966/67-1971/72
 Umesh Gotkhindikar, 1995/96-1998/99
 Sunil Gudge, 1979/80-1996/97
 Swapnil Gugale, 2010/11-2015/16
 Deorao Gundi, 1946/47-1951/52
 Milind Gunjal, 1978/79-1992/93
 Chitaman Gupte, 1940/41
 Madhukar Gupte, 1961/62-1977/78
 Prabhakar Gupte, 1937/38
 Rajaram Gurav, 1957/58
 Gopal Gurkhude, 2006/07
 Geet Katariya, 2014/15-2016/17

H
 Hanumant Singh, 1964/65
 Enamul Haque, 2008/09 (played international cricket for Bangladesh)
 Jacob Harris, 1936/37-1939/40
 Govind Hasabnis, 1954/55-1961/62
 Krishna Havaldar, 1962/63-1964/65
 Ramesh Hazare, 1986/87-1992/93
 Vijay Hazare, 1934/35-1941/42

I
 Sameer Inamdar, 1992/93-1998/99
 Ajit Indulkar, 1981/82
 Mahipatrao Indulkar, 1951/52
 Pradeep Ingle, 1975/76-1977/78
 AS Irani, 1934/35
 Naushir Irani, 1959/60-1960/61

J
 Avinash Jadhav, 1993/94
 Dheeraj Jadhav, 1999/00-2006/07
 Kedar Jadhav, 2006/07-2015/16
 Krishnarao Jadhav, 1936/37-1947/48
 Rohit Jadhav, 2005/06-2006/07
 Shrikant Jadhav, 1982/83-1993/94
 Sunil Jadhav, 2007/08
 Vaibhav Govind Jadhav,  2000/2001
 Raja of Jath, 1935/36-1951/52
 Bhagtheria Jayantilal, 1969/70
 Santosh Jedhe, 1989/90-1997/98
 Naoomal Jeoomal, 1941/42
 Bhalchandra Joglekar, 1985/86-1989/90
 Domnic Joseph, 2011/12-2015/16
 Avinash Joshi, 1961/62-1969/70
 Ajinkya Joshi, 2004/05-2011/12
 Dhundhiraj Joshi, 1957/58-1961/62
 Nana Joshi, 1946/47-1964/65
 Sham Joshi, 1948/49-1949/50
 Vithal Joshi, 1966/67-1975/76

K
 Swaroop Kabadi, 1967/68-1972/73
 Kaustuba Kadam, 1997/98
 Ramesh Kadam, 1987/88
 Yuvraj Kadam, 1990/91-1991/92
 Bhagwan Kakad, 1996/97
 Rohit Kakade, 2004/05
 Sujit Kalbhor, 2001/02
 Abhijit Kale, 1993/94-2005/06
 Shrikant Kalyani, 1983/84-1988/89
 Dilip Kamath, 1965/66
 Indrajeet Kamtekar, 1994/95-2001/02
 Ranjit Kamtekar, 2001/02
 Prasad Kanade, 1990/91-1995/96
 Rahul Kanade, 1995/96-1998/99
 Hemant Kanitkar, 1963/64-1977/78
 Hrishikesh Kanitkar, 1994/95-2007/08
 Danesh Kayani, 1996/97
 Shamshuzama Kazi, 2014/15-2015/16
 Vinod Kedar, 1971/72-1973/74
 Dhruv Kelavkar, 1989/90
 VV Ketkar, 1945/46
 Harshad Khadiwale, 2006/07-2015/16
 Kashinath Khadkikar, 2002/03-2004/05
 Prashant Khopkar, 1993-94
 Azim Khan, 1983/84-1987/88
 Akhlaq Khan, 1964/65-1970/71
 Kuddus Khan, 1956/57-1965/66
 Nissar Khan, 1958/59-1959/60
 Noor Khan, 2007/08
 Nitin Khaniwale, 1977/78-1981/82
 Bhikaji Kharat, 1957/58-1958/59
 Vinayak Khedkar, 1985/86-1988/89
 Aniruddha Kher, 1985/86
 Datta Kher, 1958/59-1965/66
 Ranjit Khirid, 2001/02-2005/06
 Saeed Khot, 2001/02-2002/03
 Chirag Khurana, 2008/09-2015/16
 Hemant Kinikar, 1992/93-2000/01
 Sanjay Kirtane, 1964/65-1970/71
 Gogumal Kishenchand, 1941/42
 Sharad Kolhatkar, 1968/69-1969/70
 Sanjay Kondhalkar, 1989/90-2001/02
 Manish Kotasthane, 1990/91-1991/92
 Ganesh Kukade, 2008/09
 Charudatta Kulkarni, 2003/04
 Milind Kulkarni, 1992/93-2000/01
 Sudhir Kulkarni, 1970/71-1971/72

L
 Mohan Lal, 1948/49
 Satyen Lande, 1992/93-2000/01
 Rajendra Lele, 1980/81-1981/82
 Sandeep Lele, 2002/03
 C. Limaye, 1964/65

M
 KM Madhavan, 1934/35
 Prakashi Malve, 1971/72
 Shalu Mandar, 1996/97
 Gopal Mane, 1946/47-1947/48
 Mun Mangela, 2008/09
 Vijay Manjrekar, 1966/67-1969/70
 Vinoo Mankad, 1943/44
 Rajendra Manohar, 1992/93-1993/94
 Madhav Mantri, 1942/43
 Kunal Marathe, 2004/05
 Marutirao Mathe, 1951/52-1960/61
 Arvind Mehendale, 1974/75
 RK Modgil, 1952/53
 Sher Mohammad, 1954/55-1964/65
 Dhruv Mohan, 2003/04-2007/08
 Ashok Mohol, 1968/69
 Sadanand Mohol, 1959/60-1970/71
 Balkrishna Mohoni, 1934/35-1941/42
 Malcolm Montero, 2006/07
 Mahendra More, 1990/91-1996/97
 Prabhakar More, 1991/92
 Vishant More, 2007/08-2015/16
 Rohit Motwani, 2006/07-2015/16
 Baba Mullick, 1937/38-1938/39
 Shrikant Mundhe, 2006/07-2015/16

N
 Bapu Nadkarni, 1951/52-1959/60
 Sushil Nadkarni, 1995/96
 Noshirvan Nagarwala, 1934/35-1939/40
 Mutyalswami Naidu, 1934/35-1940/41
 Hanumant Naik, 1957/58
 Nikhil Naik, 2012/13-2015/16
 Sachin Nair, 1998/99-2003/04
 Karansinh Nandey, 2011/12
 Jaideep Narse, 1992/93-2002/03
 Syed Nazir Ali, 1934/35-1941/42
 Anant Neralkar, 1992/93
 Mansingh Nigade, 2005/06-2006/07
 B. B. Nimbalkar, 1941/42-1950/51
 R. B. Nimbalkar, 1934/35-1940/41
 Suryaji Nimbalkar, 1980/81-1982/83

O
 Aniruddha Oak, 1997/98-2002/03
 Sham Oak, 1981/82-1991/92

P
 Prashant Bhoir ,2008/09
 Sadashiv Palsule, 1948/49-1951/52
 PN Pandav, 1964/65
 Nikhil Pande, 2002/03-2003/04
 Ranjit Pande, 1997/98-1998/99
 Bal Pandit, 1959/60
 Vinayak Pandit, 1942/43-1944/45
 Nikhil Paradkar, 2006/07-2014/15
 Madhav Paranjpe, 1941/42-1951/52
 Chandrakant Patankar, 1966/67
 Munaf Patel, 2005/06-2007/08
 Afzal Pathan, 1974/75-1979/80
 Amit Patil, 2004/05-2005/06
 Dattatraya Patil, 1951/52
 Jitendra Patil, 2006/07-2009/10
 Sadashiv Patil, 1952/53-1963/64
 Subhash Patki, 1958/59-1959/60
 Subhash Patne, 1976/77-1977/78
 Gajanan Patwardhan, 1947/48-1951/52
 Manohar Patwardhan, 1937/38-1941/42
 Vedant Patwardhan, 1999/00
 Yogesh Pawar, 2002/03-2005/06
 Satish Pednekar, 1968/69-1972/73
 Dattu Phadkar, 1942/43-1943/44
 Nandan Phadnis, 1986/87-1995/96
 Riaz Poonawala, 1982/83-1987/88
 Krishnajirao Powar, 1953/54-1960/61
 Shankarrao Powar, 1940/41
 Prasad Pradhan, 1981/82-1987/88
 Hanumant Pujari, 2009/10

R
 Prakash Rajguru, 1965/66
 Avinash Ranade, 1977/78-1978/79
 Madhav Ranade, 1975/76-1977/78
 Khandu Rangnekar, 1939/40-1941/42
 Shubham Ranjane, 2011/12-2012/13
 Subash Ranjane, 1984/85-2001/02
 Vasant Ranjane, 1956/57-1970/71
 Yalaka Venugopal Rao, 2007/08
 Abhishek Raut, 2005/06-2006/07
 Chandrakant Raut, 1972/73
 Prasant Ray, 1991/92-1993/94
 Madhusudan Rege, 1944/45-1954/55
 Jacob Reuben, 1952/53
 Kishan Rungta, 1953/54

S
 Nicholas Saldanha, 1963/64-1977/78
 Stanley Saldanha, 1975/76-1981/82
 Pandurang Salgaoncar, 1971/72-1981/82
 Madhukar Salvi, 1965/66-1967/68
 Ramachandra Salvi, 1939/40-1959/60
 Mandar Sane, 1995/96-2002/03
 Narayan Sane, 1935/36
 Wasuderao Sane, 1937/38
 Anupam Sanklecha, 2004/05-2015/16
 Chandu Sarwate, 1940/41-1942/43
 Satyajit Satbhai, 2001/02-2006/07
 Mukund Sathe, 1958/59
 Mohsin Sayyed, 2011/12
 Wahid Sayyed, 2007/08-2008/09
 Sagar Shah, 1999/00-2003/04
 Parag Shahane, 1997/98-1999/00
 Abbas Shaikh, 1971/72-1974/75
 Anwar Shaikh, 1965/66-1977/78
 Mustafa Shaikh, 1979/80
 Naushad Shaikh, 2015/16
 Samir Shaikh, 1999/00-2001/02
 Rajeev Sharangapani, 1975/76
 Vijay Sharma, 1978/79-1981/82
 Ayub Sheikh, 1955/56
 Rajbhau Shelke, 1951/52
 Vijay Shetty, 1975/76-1985/86
 Deepak Shilamkar, 2006/07-2009/10
 Kshitij Shinde, 2004/05
 Sadu Shinde, 1940/41-1949/50
 Ameya Shrikhande, 2007/08-2011/12
 Iqbal Siddiqui, 1992/93-2004/05
 Pradeep Sidhaye, 1975/76-1979/80
 Yeshwant Sidhaye, 1952/53-1966/67
 Ranga Sohoni, 1935/36-1959/60
 Bharat Solanki, 2012/13-2015/16
 Anant Solkar, 1976/77-1980/81
 Mirmisa Sridhar, 1973/74
 Sridharan Sriram, 2006/07
 Shantanu Sugwekar, 1987/88-2001/02
 Jaffar Suleiman, 1934/35
 Sajin Sureshnath, 2009/10-2014/15
 Ashish Suryawanshi, 2006/07-2007/08

T
 Yogesh Takawale, 2005/06-2007/08
 Suhas Talim, 1972/73-1975/76
 NG Talukdar, 1935/36-1936/37
 Hemant Talwalkar, 1977/78-1984/85
 Madhav Tamhankar, 1961/62
 Taranjeet Singh, 2009/10-2011/12
 Ashish Tibrewala, 2004/05
 Gaurappa Todalbaji, 1961/62-1964/65
 Shriram Torvi, 1978/79-1980/81
 Sandeep Trigune, 2002/03
 Rahul Tripathi, 2009/10-2015/16
 Trimbak Tulpule, 1934/35-1936/37

U
 Vaibhav Govind Jadhav, 2000-2001

V
 Mangesh Vaidya, 1993/94-1997/98
 R. Vaidya, 1980/81
 S. Vanspal, 1948/49–1949/50

W
 Digambar Waghmare, 2006/07-2010/11
 Anil Walhekar, 1981/82-1988/89
 Srinivas Wayangankar, 1963/64

Y
 Sunil Yadav, 2011/12-2013/14
 Yajurvindra Singh, 1971/72-1978/79
 Mohammad Yakub, 1934/35
 Anand Yalvigi, 2001/02
 DK Yarde, 1940/41
 Ravindra Yerawadekar, 1989/90-1992/93

Z
 Vijay Zol, 2011/12-2014/15

Notes

References

Maharashtra cricketers

cricketers